was a town located in Nakakoma District, Yamanashi Prefecture, Japan.

As of 2003, the town had an estimated population of 16,934 and a population density of 1,678.30 persons per km². The total area was 10.09 km².

On February 20, 2006, Tatomi, along with the town of Tamaho (also from Nakakoma District), and the village of Toyotomi (from Higashiyatsushiro District), was merged to create the city of Chūō.

External links
 Chūō official website 

Dissolved municipalities of Yamanashi Prefecture
Chūō, Yamanashi